Nydia Lamarque (1906–1982) was an Argentine poet. In addition to publishing several books of poetry, she was a lawyer, activist, and translator. She was associated with the socialism and feminism movements.

Biography

Early life 
Lamarque was born in Buenos Aires, Argentina, and was of partial French descent on her father's side. At age 12, she began writing poetry.

Poetry and translation 
In 1925, Lamarque published , her first book of poetry. In 1927, she published . In 1930, her third work, was published. In 1950, she published , and in 1951, she published .

She was fluent in French and was known as a "prominent translator of French literature," translating the work of "Baudelaire, Racine, Rimbaud, Henri De Man, Adolfo Boschot, and Héctor Berlioz." In 1948, she published the first translation of Baudelaire in Argentina.

Law career 
Lamarque worked as a defense attorney and was hired by the Red International Association.

Socialism and feminism 
Lamarque was involved in Boedo, a "vanguard writers' group," and was a member of  Buenos Aires. She was also associated with the Argentinean Communist Party and "concerned [herself] with social problems." She served as president of the Argentinean Antiwar Committee and organized the Latin American Antiwar Conference in March 1933.

In July 1933, Lamarque published an article in the magazine Contra, in which she argued that "art, as a product and synthesis of social factors, reflects the reality of society" and that "pure art is the decadence of the bourgeoisie" and defended the "triumphant proletarian art of the U.S.S.R."

Critical reception 
In 1925, Jorge Luis Borges wrote positively about Lamarque's work in Spanish, comparing it to Alfonsina Storni's and saying that it had neither "the vagueness nor the gossipy shrillness that this Storni tends to offer us." He dedicated his poetry collection, Fervor of Buenos Aires, to Lemarque.

In Literatura Argentina Contemporanea, literary critic Juan Pinto referred to Lamarque as "the poetess with the most masculine voice of our literature."

References 

1906 births
1982 deaths
20th-century Argentine poets
Argentine communists
Argentine activists
Argentine women activists
Argentine translators
People from Buenos Aires
Argentine people of French descent
Socialist feminists
20th-century translators